Maharaja Vibhuti Narayan Singh (5 November 1927 – 25 December 2000) was the king of Benares, a city considered holy, located in the Indian state of Uttar Pradesh. He was the last Bhumihar king of the Kingdom of Kashi.

Childhood
Vibhuti Narayan Singh was born on 5 November 1927. He was adopted in June 1934 by Maharaja Aditya Narayan Singh (1874–1939), the King of Benares. The day after the Maharaja's death on 4 April 1939, Vibhuti Narayan Singh was appointed his successor to the Narayan dynasty.

Education

Singh studied at Mayo College, Ajmer. He received his master's degree in Sanskrit from Banaras Hindu University, Varanasi, where he studied with the famous grammarian, Vagish Shastri. He was a scholar of Sanskrit, Veda and Purana.

Contribution

On 28 January 1983 the Vishwanath Temple was taken over by the government of Uttar Pradesh and its management was transferred to a trust of which Singh was president.

In 1947, under his leadership, the Shree Kashi Naresh Education Trust laid the foundation of the Kashi Naresh Government Post Graduate College (KNPG), in the Gyanpur of Bhadohi district (U.P).

An intermediate college is named after him in Gyanpur and another in Surajpur at Mau district  in Uttar Pradesh.

Death
Singh died on 25 December 2000. His body was cremated with state honors at Manikarnika Ghat in Varanasi.

References

Banaras Hindu University alumni
Indian Hindus
1927 births
2000 deaths
Indian Sanskrit scholars
Maharajas of Benares
Narayan dynasty
20th-century Indian royalty
People from Varanasi
Scholars from Varanasi